HMS Torbay is a decommissioned  nuclear submarine of the Royal Navy and the fourth vessel of her class. Torbay was the fifth vessel and the second submarine of the Royal Navy to be named after Torbay in Devon, England. The first vessel was the 80-gun second rate HMS Torbay launched in 1693.

She was the first vessel to be fitted with the new command system SMCS-NG.

Torbay was scheduled to be decommissioned in 2015, to be replaced by one of the new Astute-class submarines.  she was undergoing extended maintenance and upgrades. The work allowed for a two-year life extension beyond the previously-planned decommissioning date. On 6 June 2017, she entered Gibraltar Naval Base flying her paying-off pennant and, on Friday 14 July 2017, the vessel was decommissioned in Devonport.

Operational history
Torbay completed a refuel and modernisation process in February 2001.

In early 2006, Torbay was the participant in an experiment in the use of colour schemes to reduce the visibility of submarines from the air. The standard black paint of Royal Navy submarines was replaced by a carefully selected shade of blue.  This was the result of research that found that black was the worst possible colour for a submarine attempting to avoid detection from the air. This change is in part the result of the changing nature of Royal Navy commitments since the end of the Cold War, with Navy operations moving from the murky waters of the North Atlantic to the clearer waters of the Arabian Sea and the Indian Ocean.

In November 2010, it was reported in Hansard that Torbay had run aground in the Eastern Mediterranean in April 2009.

In May 2011, she took part in Exercise Saxon Warrior in the Western Approaches. The exercise included the aircraft carrier , HMS Dauntless, HMS Westminster, and a number of other vessels and culminated in a "Thursday War".

In late 2011 she entered a revalidation and assisted maintenance period (RAMP) at Devonport Royal Dockyard. This includes communications upgrades with installation of the Cromwell radio antenna to enhance internal communications and the ship alongside upgrade, plus inspection of the hull and reactor, an overhaul of one of the reactor coolers and upgrades to many other systems.  the RAMP was 85% complete, with a return to service originally planned for summer 2013.

In 2013, there was a fire on board.

She made her final entry to Devonport on 19 June 2017 prior to her formal decommissioning parade on 14 July 2017.

References

Bibliography

External links

Royal Navy HMS Torbay (royalnavy.mod.uk)

 

Trafalgar-class submarines
Ships built in Barrow-in-Furness
1985 ships
Cold War submarines of the United Kingdom